This uniform polyhedron compound is a symmetric arrangement of 20 tetrahemihexahedra. It is chiral with icosahedral symmetry (I). 

John Skilling notes, in his enumeration of uniform compounds of uniform polyhedra, that this compound of 20 tetrahemihexahedra is unique in that it cannot be obtained by "adding symmetry to a group in which the basic polyhedron is uniform". Each tetrahemihexahedron in this compound is embedded with symmetry group C3, which does not act transitively over the tetrahemihexahedron's six vertices. However, the compound as a whole can achieve uniformity because two tetrahemihexahedra coincide at each vertex.

Related polyhedra 

This compound shares its edge arrangement with the great dirhombicosidodecahedron, the great disnub dirhombidodecahedron, and the compound of 20 octahedra.

The edges and 20 of the triangular faces occur in one enantiomer of the great snub dodecicosidodecahedron, with the other 60 triangular faces occurring in the other enantiomer.

See also 
 Compound of five tetrahemihexahedra

References 
.

Polyhedral compounds